The 6th Golden Bell Awards was held on 25 March 1970 at the Unite Hotel in Taipei, Taiwan. The ceremony was hosted by Chung Chiao-kuang.

Winners

References

1970
1970 in Taiwan